Antoine Burns (born October 31, 1979) is a former American football wide receiver/defensive back.

High school career
Burns played football at North Division High School in Milwaukee, Wisconsin.  He also played basketball and was a member of the track & field team.

College career
Burns began his collegiate career at Rochester Community and Technical College where he was selected as a junior college All-American.  He earned a scholarship to the University of Minnesota where he was an All-Big Ten Conference selection in his junior and senior years.   Burns finished his collegiate career with 75 receptions for 1,006 yards and seven touchdowns.  He also returned 13 kickoffs for 253 yards.  As a senior in 2002, Burns led the Golden Gophers with 44 catches for 526 yards and four scores.

Professional career
Antoine Burns signed with the Cleveland Browns following the 2003 NFL draft. After being waived, he was signed to the Seattle Seahawks' practice squad. Seattle allocated Burns to the Amsterdam Admirals of the NFL Europe, but he injured his ankle in the first game of the season. In 2004, he moved to the practice squad of the Carolina Panthers, where he remained for the 2005 season.

In 2006 Burns, an AFL rookie with the Los Angeles Avengers, set a single-season team record for kickoff return yardage. In 10 games he returned 51 kickoffs for 984 yards and two touchdowns. His record broke the team's single-season record of 956 set by Kevin Ingram in 2004. Burns also finished the 2006 season with 19 receptions for 239 yards. In addition, he ran the ball three times for 22 yards and averaged a team-high 124.5 all-purpose yards per game.

Coaching career
Burns served as the Assistant Head Coach and Receivers Coach with the Club Status program at the University of Wisconsin-Milwaukee from 2013 to 2016, Milwaukee Panthers football He also has spent time coaching at his Alma - Mater Milwaukee North Division and at Milwaukee Vincent High school.

Burns has also as a Director of NFL Alumni Youth Football camps since 2013.

References

External links
AFL stats

1979 births
Living people
Players of American football from Milwaukee
American football wide receivers
American football defensive backs
Minnesota Golden Gophers football players
Amsterdam Admirals players
Los Angeles Avengers players
Milwaukee Iron players
Milwaukee Mustangs (2009–2012) players
Rochester Yellowjackets (NJCAA) football players
Green Bay Blizzard players
North Division High School (Milwaukee) alumni